Interruptus may refer to:

Bromus interruptus, commonly known as the interrupted brome, a plant in the true grass family
Calliostoma interruptus, a species of sea snail, a marine gastropod mollusk in the family Calliostomatidae
Devario interruptus, very similar to Devario shanensis
Eristalis interruptus, a European species of hoverfly
Melanochromis interruptus, a species of fish in the family Cichlidae
Nicrophorus interruptus, a burying beetle described by Stephens in 1830
Passalus interruptus, a beetle of the family Passalidae
Polypogon interruptus, commonly known as ditch beard grass, is a species of grass
Uraeotyphlus interruptus, a species of caecilian found in India

See also
Coitus interruptus, birth-control technique in which a man withdraws his penis from a woman prior to ejaculation during intercourse